Juho Heimonen (14 July 1861, Rautalampi – 11 October 1930) was a Finnish farmer and politician. He served as a Member of the Parliament of Finland from 1908 to 1909, representing the Agrarian League.

References

1861 births
1930 deaths
People from Rautalampi
People from Kuopio Province (Grand Duchy of Finland)
Centre Party (Finland) politicians
Members of the Parliament of Finland (1908–09)